1st National Bank St Lucia Ltd is a St Lucian bank formed in 2005. It was originally established as the St Lucia Cooperative Bank in 1938, making it the oldest indigenous St Lucian bank. In June 2017, it launched a project to strengthen the small and medium-sized business sectors. The next month, it introduced two scholarship programmes, the Ferrel Victor Charles Secondary School Scholarship and the Francis J. Carasco Scholarship.

See also 

 List of banks in the Americas

References

External links
1st National Bank of St Lucia website

Banks of Saint Lucia
Banks established in 1938
1938 establishments in Saint Lucia